The International Parallel and Distributed Processing Symposium (or IPDPS) is an annual conference for engineers and scientists to present recent findings in the fields of parallel processing and distributed computing. In addition to technical sessions of submitted paper presentations, the meeting offers workshops, tutorials, and commercial presentations & exhibits. IPDPS is sponsored by the IEEE Computer Society's Technical Committee on Parallel Processing.

IPDPS is a week-long symposium that typically includes three days of a main track, two days of about 20 workshops bookending the main track, one or more tutorials, a panel, several keynote talks, and a banquet. The main track consists of high-quality, peer-reviewed papers representing original unpublished research in all areas of parallel and distributed processing, including the development of experimental or commercial systems. IPDPS topics of interest include, but are not limited to:

 Parallel and distributed algorithms, focusing on issues such as: stability, scalability, and fault tolerance of distributed systems, communication and synchronization protocols, network algorithms, and scheduling and load balancing.
 Applications of parallel and distributed computing, including web applications, peer-to-peer computing, grid computing, scientific applications, and mobile computing.
 Parallel and distributed architectures, including shared memory, distributed memory (including petascale system designs, and architectures with instruction-level and thread-level parallelism), special-purpose models (including signal and image processors, network processors, other special purpose processors), nontraditional processor technologies, network and interconnect architecture, parallel I/O and storage systems, system design issues for low power, design for high reliability, and performance modeling and evaluation.
 Parallel and distributed software, including parallel programming languages and compilers, runtime systems, operating systems, resource management, middleware, libraries, data mining, and programming environments and tools.

Conference history

The conference began in 1987 as the Orange County Parallel Processing Conference, before being renamed as the International Parallel Processing Symposium (IPPS). In 1998, the Symposium on Parallel and Distributed Systems (SPDP) merged with IPPS; and in 2000, the conference took the now familiar name: International Parallel and Distributed Processing Symposium (IPDPS). Five of the original volunteer organizers have served the conference for over two decades: Viktor Prasanna, George Westrom, Sally Jelinek Westrom, Susamma Barua, and Bill Pitts.

 1987 - Fullerton, California, United States
 1988 -  Fullerton, California, USA
 1989 -  Fullerton, California, USA
 1990 -  Fullerton, California, USA
 1991 - Anaheim, California, USA
 1992 - Beverly Hills, California, USA
 1993 - Newport Beach, California, USA
 1994 - Cancún, Mexico
 1995 - Santa Barbara, California, USA
 1996 - Honolulu, Hawaii, USA
 1997 - Geneva, Switzerland
 1998 - Orlando, Florida, USA
 1999 - San Juan, Puerto Rico
 2000 - Cancún, Mexico
 2001 - San Francisco, California, USA
 2002 - Fort Lauderdale, Florida, USA
 2003 - Nice, France
 2004 - Santa Fe, New Mexico, USA
 2005 - Denver, Colorado, USA
 2006 - Rhodes Island, Greece
 2007 - Long Beach, California, USA
 2008 - Miami, Florida, USA
 2009 - Rome, Italy
 2010 - Atlanta, Georgia, USA
 2011 - Anchorage, Alaska, USA
 2012 - Shanghai, China
 2013 - Cambridge, Massachusetts, USA
 2014 - Phoenix, Arizona, USA
 2015 - Hyderabad, India
 2016 - Chicago, Illinois, USA
 2017 - Orlando, Florida, USA
 2018 - Vancouver, British Columbia, Canada
 2019 - Rio de Janeiro, Brazil
 2020 - New Orleans, USA [virtual]
 2021 - Portland, USA [virtual]
 2022 - Lyon, France
 2023 - St. Petersburg, Florida, USA

IEEE Computer Society Charles Babbage Award
In 1989, the conference established the Charles Babbage Award to be given each year to a conference participant in recognition of exceptional contributions to the field. In almost all cases, the award is given to one of the invited keynote speakers at the conference. The selection is made by the steering committee chairs, upon recommendation from the Program Chair and General Chair who have been responsible for the technical program of the conference, including inviting the speakers. It is presented immediately following the selected speaker's presentation at the conference, and he or she is given a plaque that specifies the nature of their special contribution to the field that is being recognized by IPDPS.  In 2019, The management of the IEEE CS Babbage Award was transferred to the IEEE Computer Society's Awards Committee.

Past recipients:
2023 - Keshav Pingali
2022 - Dhabaleswar K. (DK) Panda
2021 - Guy Blelloch
2020 - Yves Robert
2019 - Ian Foster
2017 - Mateo Valero
2015 - Alan Edelman
2014 - Peter Kogge
2013 - James Demmel
2012 - Chris Johnson
2011 - Jack Dongarra
2010 - Burton Smith
2009 - Wen-Mei Hwu
2008 - Joel Saltz
2007 - Mike Flynn
2006 - Bill Dally
2005 - Yale N. Patt
2004 - Christos Papadimitriou
2003 - Michel Cosnard
2002 - Steve Wallach
2001 - Thomson Leighton
2000 - Michael O. Rabin
1999 - K. Mani Chandy
1998 - Jim Gray
1997 - Frances E. Allen
1995 - Richard Karp
1994 - Arvind
1993 - K. Mani Chandy
1992 - David Kuck
1991 - Harold S. Stone
1990 - H.T. Kung
1989 - Irving S. Reed

See also
 List of distributed computing conferences

References

External links
 

Distributed computing conferences
Recurring events established in 1987
IEEE conferences